The INS Mulki was a Mahé class Indian naval minesweeper, named after Mulki, India, a port on the Malabar Coast. She remained in service until decommissioned at Naval Base Kochi.

Service

The INS Mulki was in service from 1984-2003.

References

Mahé-class minesweepers